Cameron Charles Beaubier (born December 6, 1992) is an American motorcycle racer. He won the MotoAmerica championship 5 times. In 2022 he rode a Kalex in the Moto2 World Championship.

Career

Early career
After competing in the 2007 Red Bull MotoGP Rookies Cup, Beaubier was selected to join the Red Bull MotoGP Academy; in 2008 he raced in the 125cc Spanish CEV Championship and in  he had a full season in the 125cc World Championship. During this time he was a teammate of future MotoGP champion Marc Marquez.

Racing in America
Beaubier then returned to America, where he contested the AMA Supersport East Championship in 2010 and the AMA Pro Daytona Sportbike Championship from 2011 to 2013, where he won the title and the Daytona 200 race. From 2014, Beaubier competed in the AMA Superbike Championship, winning the championship five times—2015, 2016, 2018, 2019 and 2020 with the new series promoter, Wayne Rainey, and Dorna's MotoAmerica organization.

In 2016, Beaubier was a guest instructor at the Yamaha Champions Riding School.

Return to Grand Prix motorcycle racing
After dominating the 2020 MotoAmerica Honos Superbike Championship Beaubier signed a two year deal to race in the Moto2 World Championship for American Racing, marking his return to Grand Prix racing and replacing fellow American Joe Roberts. He is coached by American Racing team manager, former MotoGP rider John Hopkins.

Career statistics

Grand Prix motorcycle racing

By season

By class

Races by year
(key) (Races in bold indicate pole position; races in italics indicate fastest lap)

Superbike World Championship

Races by year
(key) (Races in bold indicate pole position; races in italics indicate fastest lap)

References

External links
 

1992 births
Living people
American motorcycle racers
125cc World Championship riders
Sportspeople from Roseville, California
AMA Superbike Championship riders
Superbike World Championship riders
Moto2 World Championship riders